Milton Leonard "Mickey" Kobrosky (February 22, 1915 – May 29, 2003) was an American football player. After playing quarterback collegiately for Trinity College, he played one season in the National Football League (NFL) for the New York Giants.

Kobrosky was posthumously elected to the College Football Hall of Fame in 2011.

References

1915 births
2003 deaths
American football quarterbacks
New York Giants players
Trinity Bantams football players
College Football Hall of Fame inductees